Peter Richtarik is a Slovak mathematician and computer scientist working in the area of big data optimization and machine learning, known for his work on randomized coordinate descent algorithms, stochastic gradient descent and federated learning. He is currently a Professor of Computer Science at the King Abdullah University of Science and Technology.

Education
Richtarik earned a master's degree in mathematics from Comenius University, Slovakia, in 2001, graduating summa cum laude. In 2007, he obtained a PhD in operations research from Cornell University, advised by Michael Jeremy Todd.

Career
Between 2007 and 2009, he was a postdoctoral scholar in the Center for Operations Research and Econometrics and Department of Mathematical Engineering at Universite catholique de Louvain, Belgium, working with Yurii Nesterov. Between 2009 and 2019, Richtarik was a Lecturer and later Reader in the School of Mathematics at the University of Edinburgh. He is a Turing Fellow. Richtarik founded and organizes a conference series entitled "Optimization and Big Data".

Academic work
Richtarik's early research concerned gradient-type methods, optimization in relative scale, sparse principal component analysis and algorithms for optimal design. Since his appointment at Edinburgh, he has been working extensively on building algorithmic foundations of randomized methods in convex optimization, especially randomized coordinate descent algorithms and stochastic gradient descent methods. These methods are well suited for optimization problems described by big data and have applications in fields such as machine learning, signal processing and data science. Richtarik is the co-inventor of an algorithm generalizing the randomized Kaczmarz method for solving a system of linear equations, contributed to the invention of federated learning, and co-developed a stochastic variant of the Newton's method.

Awards and distinctions
 2020, Due to his Hirsch index of 40 or more, he belongs among top 0.05% of computer scientists. 
 2016, SIGEST Award (jointly with Olivier Fercoq) of the Society for Industrial and Applied Mathematics
 2016, EPSRC Early Career Fellowship in Mathematical Sciences 
 2015, EUSA Best Research or Dissertation Supervisor Award (2nd place)
 2014, Plenary Talk at 46th Conference of Slovak Mathematicians

Bibliography

References

External links
 Richtarik's professional web page
 Richtarik's Google Scholar profile

Living people
Slovak mathematicians
Cornell University alumni
Year of birth missing (living people)